HMTSS Te Mataili (801) was a  provided by Australia to Tuvalu, and operated by the Tuvalu Police Force.  Tuvalu has a  exclusive economic zone, and Te Mataili was its sole long range patrol vessel, until it was retired, and replaced by the larger and more modern .

Background

Design

Australia designed the patrol vessels using commercial off-the-shelf equipment, to make it easier to maintain the vessels in small, remote, shipyards.

Operational history

The International Work Group for Indigenous Affairs an international human rights group, questioned how the government used Te Mataili after it invoked Tuvalu's Public Order Act, suspending public gatherings, for 14 days, in January 2011.  She was moored near the official residences of the Governor General and Prime Minister.  Some commentators expressed that, if her crew were armed it would have eroded Tuvalu's peaceful traditions.

In October 2011 the government of Tuvalu had to declare a state of emergency when potable water reserves dropped to a dangerous level.  Te Mataili carried a Red Cross desalinization unit to Nukulaelae.

On March 3, 2017, Te Mataili rescued two distressed fishers, off Fuafatu.

Te Mataili escorted , carrying Polynesian leaders to Amatuka, on July 5, 2018. On November 22, 2018 Te Mataili carried the body of former Prime Minister Apisai Ielemia from the capital to his home island, Vaitupu.

Like all other redundant Pacific Forum vessels she was returned to Australia for recycling.

References

Ships of Tuvalu
Pacific Forum class patrol vessels